AD 21 (XXI) was a common year starting on Friday of the Julian calendar. At the time, it was known as the Year of the Consulship of Tiberius and Drusus (or, less frequently, year 774 Ab urbe condita). The denomination AD 21 for this year has been used since the early medieval period, when the Anno Domini calendar era became the prevalent method in Europe for naming years.

Events

By place

Roman Empire 
 The Aedui revolt under Julius Florus and Julius Sacrovir; the revolt is suppressed by Gaius Silius.
 Emperor Tiberius is a Roman Consul for the fourth time.

 The Romans create a buffer state in the territory of the Quadi, in southern Slovakia.
 Barracks are constructed for the Praetorian Guard, on the Quirinal (located on the Seven Hills of Rome).

Korea 
 King Daeso of Dongbuyeo is killed in battle against the armies of Goguryeo, led by its third ruler, King Daemusin.

By topic

Art and Science 
 The manufacture of pens and metal writing tools begins in Rome (approximate date).
</onlyinclude>

Births

Deaths 
 Arminius, Germanic military leader (b. 18/17 BC)
 Clutorius Priscus, Roman poet (b. c. 20 BC)
 Daeso of Dongbuyeo, Korean king (b. 60 BC)
 Marcus Valerius Messalla Barbatus, Roman consul (b. 11 BC)
 Publius Sulpicius Quirinius, Roman governor (b. c. 51 BC) 
 Wang (or Xiaomu), Chinese empress of the Xin Dynasty

References 

0021

als:20er#21